Mohammad Aminul Islam (born 2 February 1968) is a former Bangladeshi cricketer and captain.

Aminul scored the first hundred for the Bangladesh cricket team when Bangladesh played their first Test against India thus becoming only the third cricketer after Charles Bannerman and Dave Houghton to score centuries on their own and their country's test debut. He was one of Bangladesh's most celebrated cricketers in the pre-Test-status era.

Early years
Just two years after quitting soccer due to an injury, Aminul Islam (commonly known as Bulbul) saw himself representing International Cricket Council (ICC) Associates Young Cricketers' squad in the first-ever Youth World Cup held in Australia where he took six wickets with his off spin, one of which was that of Brian Lara. The same year he made his ODI debut for the national Cricket team at Chittagong in the Asia Cup (1988). He scored 27 in the match against Sri Lanka.

A year later, he scored a century against Malaysia in the U-19 Asian cup. In 1995, he scored a century against the visiting England A side in a three-day match at Dhaka.

In ODIs
Despite the fact that his ODI career started in 1988, and went on until 2001–02, he played only 39 ODI matches. This was due to the fact that before becoming a full member of ICC in 2000, Bangladesh very seldom got the chance to play official one day internationals.
Over the years Bulbul's role in the side changed. In the initial years he was a lower order batsman cum off spin bowler. In the later years he mainly concentrated on his batting. His highest ODI score of 70 came against India at Mohali in 1998. His best bowling 3/57, came against Zimbabwe at Nairobi in October 1997.

Career ODI batting performances:

In ICC Trophy
Bulbul represented Bangladesh in three ICC trophy tournaments, in 1990, 1994 and 1997. However, he failed to perform up to expectation in both 1990 and 1994. But, after a slow start in the 1997 event in KL, he came good in the big matches. In the semi-final against Scotland he scored 57, sharing 3rd wicket stand of 115 with Khaled Mashud Pilot. In the final he scored a quickfire 37 out of 37 balls (with 1 six and 1 four). he shared a 53 run 4th wicket stand with skipper Akram Khan.

As a captain
He took over the captaincy of the national team in 1998. He was the captain of the Bangladesh cricket team in the 1999 Cricket World Cup.

As a coach and instructor 
Aminul Islam is one of Bangladesh's most qualified coaches at the moment and currently serves as ICC's Cricket Development officer for China, Hong Kong, UAE, Singapore, Thailand and Myanmar. He completed his Level-1, Level-2 and Level-3 coaching degrees from Cricket Victoria and has trained club sides in Melbourne and Sydney. He finished the initial two levels of instructing courses from Cricket Australia in 2005. He began working for the Asian Cricket Council improvement program and furthermore finished the renowned Level-3 instructing a course in 2009. In eight years at the ACC, he led around 80 training courses in Afghanistan, Brunei, China, Malaysia, Myanmar, Singapore, and the UAE. He became Asia development manager for the ICC in 2016. As of 2023, he lives in Australia.

References

External links
 Cricinfo Player Profile
 Daily Star
 Bangla Cricket

Bangladesh One Day International cricketers
Bangladesh Test cricketers
Cricketers who made a century on Test debut
Bangladeshi cricketers
20th-century Bangladeshi cricketers
21st-century Bangladeshi cricketers
Bangladeshi cricket captains
Biman Bangladesh Airlines cricketers
Marylebone Cricket Club cricketers
Dhaka Division cricketers
Cricketers at the 1998 Commonwealth Games
Cricketers at the 1999 Cricket World Cup
Living people
1968 births
Bangladeshi cricket coaches
Recipients of the Bangladesh National Sports Award
Commonwealth Games competitors for Bangladesh
Cricketers from Dhaka